Mireille Vincendon, née Kramer (born 1910) was a French-language Egyptian writer. She wrote two collections of poetry, short stories and a novel.

Life
Mereille Kramer was born in Cairo in 1910 to an Egyptian mother and Russian father, and was educated at French schools. She married Jacques Vincendon, director of the Land Bank of Egypt.

Encouraged by the composer Florent Schmitt, for whom she wrote words to be set to music, Vincendon took up literary activity in the late 1940s, publishing in the Egyptian French-language press. In 1956 she left Egypt and settled in Paris. 

Vincendon's poetry "revolves around existential concerns and the limits of language". Like surrealist poetry, her free verse contained violent metaphor, though without surrealism's particular theoretical commitments. Her novel Annabel's Notebooks mixed fantasy and reality to tell the story of a girl at a French-speaking boarding-school in Egypt.

Works
 Le Dialogue des ombres [The Dialogue of Shades]. Paris: P. Seghers, 1953.
 Le Nombre du silence [The Number of Silence]. Paris: P. Seghers, 1955.
 Les Cahiers d'Annabelle [The Notebooks of Annabelle]. Paris: Mercure de France, 1957.

References

1910 births
Year of death missing
Egyptian writers in French
Egyptian novelists
Egyptian women novelists
Egyptian poets
Egyptian women poets
Egyptian short story writers
Egyptian women short story writers